Dubravka Vukušić (born 22 December 1965) is a Croatian speed skater. She competed in three events at the 1984 Winter Olympics, representing Yugoslavia.

References

1965 births
Living people
Croatian female speed skaters
Olympic speed skaters of Yugoslavia
Speed skaters at the 1984 Winter Olympics
Sportspeople from Zagreb